Alinafe Kamwala (born 15 October 1994) is a Malawian netball player who plays for Malawi in the positions of goal attack or goal shooter. She was included in the Malawian squad for the 2019 Netball World Cup, which is also her first World Cup tournament.

References 

1994 births
Living people
Malawian netball players
2019 Netball World Cup players